Bucculatrix zizyphella is a moth in the family Bucculatricidae. It was described by Pierre Chrétien in 1907. It is found in former Yugoslavia, North Macedonia and Algeria.

The wingspan is 5–6 mm.

The larvae feed on Zizyphus lotus. They mine the leaves of their host plant.

References

Arctiidae genus list at Butterflies and Moths of the World of the Natural History Museum, London

Bucculatricidae
Moths described in 1907
Moths of Europe
Moths of Africa